The Trench Trophy is an award which recognizes high school football lineman in the Western New York area. The award was founded by Len Kuhn and Carl Kuras. The Trench Trophy Award, Inc. is a 501(c)(3) charitable organization established in 2015.

Award
Players are graded on specific criteria by a group of knowledgeable scouts, known as the Committee. The Committee is composed of coaches, former coaches, and former players, who attend the games of more than 80 schools on a weekly basis. Every week five players are chosen as "Nominees," who are then eligible for the final award. After the state championships are over, nominees are broken down to twelve Hall of Fame Inductees, and then one final winner. The "Lineman of the Year" receives a college scholarship, among other accolades.

Mission
The Trench Trophy Award, Inc. provides recognition to football players who predominantly play the position of offensive or defensive line for their school’s varsity, interscholastic football program. Schools include those of Section VI of the NYSPHSAA and Monsignor Martin Athletic Conference.

The specific objectives and purpose of the Trench Trophy shall be:

A. To promote sportsmanship, civic responsibility, and scholastic effort by athletes who predominantly play football.
B. To provide recognition to football linemen in Western New York state.
C. To provide opportunities for players to be discovered by local, regional, and national intercollegiate football programs.
D. To promote the growth of youth athletics, specifically the sport of football.

John Gebhardt Memorial Scholarship
In August 2010, the Trench Trophy announced that their yearly college scholarship was named in honor of founding member and generous contributor John Gebhardt. The John Gebhardt Memorial Scholarship was decided by result of unanimous vote by the Committee. John was a dedicated supporter of the award since its inception.

Name
The name "Trench Trophy" was approved on August 18, 2003, at the first meeting of the Trench Trophy Committee. It comes from the adage that lineman play in the "trenches."

Current Executive Committee
Carl Kuras.Co-Chairman
Ed Sciera.Co-Chairman
Philip Rizzi.Secretary
Jerry Zajac.Treasurer
Rick Coburn.Trustee
Dennis Cronin.Trustee
Carl Ertel.Trustee
Chuck Graver.Trustee
Dave Hajduk.Trustee
Chuck Huber.Trustee
Ron Kromer.Trustee
Cal Phillips.Trustee
Don Sullivan.Trustee
Sibby Constantino.Trustee
Len Kuhn.Co-Founder
Victor Rizzi.Co-Founder
Joe Delamielleure.Special Contributor
Jim McNally.Special Contributor

Lineman of the Year Award Winners
Past Winners:
 2003: John Livingston.Eden Raiders
 2004: Jason Weber.Orchard Park Quakers
 2005: Jesse Jesonowski.Iroquois Chiefs
 2006: Gil Rodriguez.Frontier Falcons
 2007: Nick Christman.Sweet Home Panthers
 2008: John Urschel.Canisius Crusaders
 2009: Jasen Carlson.Southwestern Trojans
 2010: Dylan Anna.Pioneer Panthers
 2011: Devon Leach.Orchard Park Quakers
 2012: Ryan Hunter.Canisius Crusaders
 2013: Jeremiah Bill.Hamburg Bulldogs
 2014: Joe Mistretta.Jamestown Red Raiders
 2015: Jake Fuzak.Williamsville South Billies
 2016: Nathan Emer.Iroquois Chiefs
 2017: Jeremiah Sanders.South Park Sparks
 2018: Tyler Doty.St. Joe's Marauders
 2019: Teryon Vernon.Maritime Commodores
 2020: No Winner Due to Covid Shortened Season
 2021: Gavin Susfolk.Canisius Crusaders
 2022: Rashard Perry.Bennett Tigers

Hall of Fame

Grading Criteria
 Technique
 Determination
 Aggressiveness
 Intensity
 Ability to be a Team Player
 Coachability
 Consistency
 Courage
 Citizenship
 Scholastic Effort

[Size [height and/or weight] shall NOT be taken into consideration]

See also
 Elks
 Lancaster (village), New York

For More Information
 Trench Trophy Website
 Section 6 Website

References

American football trophies and awards
High school football trophies and awards in the United States